Euanisia is a genus of parasitic flies in the family Tachinidae.

Species
Euanisia mesacarrioni Blanchard, 1947

Distribution
Argentina, Uruguay.

References

Exoristinae
Taxa named by Émile Blanchard
Tachinidae genera
Diptera of South America